Andrew Thomas Hutchinson (born March 24, 1980) is an American former professional ice hockey defenseman, who played in the National Hockey League (NHL).

Playing career
As a youth, Hutchinson played in the 1994 Quebec International Pee-Wee Hockey Tournament with a minor ice hockey team from Fraser, Michigan.

Hutchinson was drafted 54th overall by the Nashville Predators in the 1999 NHL Entry Draft from the CCHA's, Michigan State University. After making his NHL debut with the Predators in the 2003–04 season, Hutchinson was traded by the Predators to the Carolina Hurricanes for a 3rd round pick on July 25, 2005. Hutchinson won the Stanley Cup in 2006 playing with the Carolina Hurricanes appearing in 36 regular season games.

On July 17, 2007, Hutchinson was traded by the Hurricanes along with Joe Barnes and a 3rd round draft pick in 2008 to the New York Rangers in exchange for Matt Cullen. Although he never played a game for the Rangers, Andrew had a superb season in the AHL serving as the Hartford Wolfpack's captain. He led all AHL defensemen in point and assists and ranked third in goals. He was elected to the 2008 AHL First-Team All Star. On April 10, 2008 Hutchinson won the Eddie Shore Award as the AHL's top defenseman for the 2007–08 season.

On July 9, 2008, Hutchinson signed a two-year deal with the Tampa Bay Lightning. He started the 2008–09 season in the AHL playing for Norfolk Admirals. In 20 games Hutch tallied 1 goal and 13 assists with the Admirals. On November 27, 2008, Hutchinson was called up to the Lightning and played in only two games before he was dealt to the Dallas Stars for Lauri Tukonen on November 30, 2008.

On July 7, 2010, Hutchinson signed as a free agent to a one-year contract with the Pittsburgh Penguins. He was assigned to AHL affiliate, the Wilkes-Barre/Scranton Penguins for the majority of the 2010–11 season, however appeared as an injury recall in 5 games with the Penguins.

On June 30, 2011, on the eve of North American free agency, Hutchinson signed his first contract abroad, signing a one-year deal with Barys Astana of the Russian Kontinental Hockey League. In the 2011–12 season, Hutchinson became a fixture on the blueline of Astana, contributing with 15 points in 53 games. He was then signed to a one-year extension on May 1, 2012.

Personal life
Andrew is married to Andrea and has 2 children; son Cole and daughter Avery.

Career statistics

Regular season and playoffs

International

Awards and honors

References

External links

1980 births
Living people
American men's ice hockey defensemen
Barys Nur-Sultan players
Carolina Hurricanes players
Dallas Stars players
EV Zug players
Hartford Wolf Pack players
Ice hockey players from Michigan
KHL Medveščak Zagreb players
Michigan State Spartans men's ice hockey players
Milwaukee Admirals players
Nashville Predators draft picks
Nashville Predators players
Norfolk Admirals players
People from Rochester Hills, Michigan
Pittsburgh Penguins players
Stanley Cup champions
Tampa Bay Lightning players
Texas Stars players
Toledo Storm players
USA Hockey National Team Development Program players
Wilkes-Barre/Scranton Penguins players
AHCA Division I men's ice hockey All-Americans